= Ordro =

Ordro is a brand of digital camera, camcorder, Android Tablet PC, cell phone and projectors that utilizes SD card, secure digital memory.

Camcorder Models range from the DDV-V8 Plus to the HDV-D350 which includes its own removable projector. The latest camcorder, HDV-D329 includes a 37mm wide angle lens and has 1,200 X Zoom. Ordro brand offers the latest in technology including camcorders, smartwatches, Android PCs and accessories. Although based in China, Ordro has sales and service offices located worldwide.

Ordro brand was founded in 2002.
